Recoil is a 1953 British crime film directed by John Gilling and starring Kieron Moore, Elizabeth Sellars and Edward Underdown.

It was filmed at Alliance Studios in Twickenham.

Plot
When thieves rob and murder her jeweller father, Jean Talbot resolves to bring them to justice by posing as a criminal and infiltrating their gang. She builds up evidence against her father's murderer by pretending to be in love with him.

Cast

Critical reception
TV Guide called the film "a taut and action-filled programmer."

References

External links

1953 films
British crime films
1953 crime films
Films directed by John Gilling
British black-and-white films
1950s English-language films
1950s British films